Jerry Lynn Griffin (b. December 10, 1944 - d. March 29, 2021) is a Canadian football player who played for the Edmonton Eskimos and Saskatchewan Roughriders.

References

1944 births
2021 deaths
American players of Canadian football
Edmonton Elks players
People from Dallas